FSBI NII Radio or NIIR is a Soviet/Russian Scientific Research Institute created in 1949 by a decree of the Soviet Government.

Description
It is currently an institute of the Russian Ministry of Informational Technologies and Communications, and performs work constructing radiocommunication systems in satellite and terrestrial TV and radio broadcasting, and the pursuit of further development of radio technologies.

Since December 2004 NIIR is headed by V. Butenko, President of the National Radio Association and a Doctor of Science.

Since May 2021 NIIR is headed by O. Ivanov.

As a result of 2005-2006 Russo-Japanese seminars on their respective radio technologies, NIIR achieved an agreement with Japan's largest infocom technopark, Yokosuka Research Park.

The NIIR is located at 105064, 16 Kazakova str., Moscow.

See also

 Phazotron-NIIR
 ELEMASH Machine-Building Plant

External links
  

Research institutes in Russia
Research institutes in the Soviet Union
Information technology research institutes
Defence companies of Russia
Federal State Unitary Enterprises of Russia
Companies based in Moscow